Piazza is a learning management system which allows students to ask questions in a forum-type format. Instructors are able to moderate the discussion, along with endorsing accurate answers. The software was invented by Pooja Nath in 2009 in order to speed response times and create a common place where students could engage in discussion outside of the classroom. Utilizing an extensive notification system and a simple layout, the response time on Piazza averages approximately 14 minutes. Instructors also have the ability to allow students to post anonymously, encouraging more in-depth discussion. The word Piazza comes from the Italian word for plaza—a common city square where people can come together to share ideas and knowledge.

History
Pooja Nath created the first prototype of Piazza in 2009 during her first year at Stanford Graduate School of Business. By February 2010, Piazza was used by approximately 600 Stanford students. In January 2011, Piazza opened to all institutions, reaching over 330 schools and tens of thousands of students by the summer of the same year.

While the service originally operated under the name 'Piazzza', in June 2011, the first 'z' was dropped from Piazza's name.

Funding
 $8M announced on February 27, 2014
 $6M announced on January 6, 2012
 $1.5M announced on July 5, 2011

Service
Users can publicly (and anonymously, if the head instructor allows it) ask questions, answer questions, and post notes. Each question prompts a collective answer to which any user can contribute and an instructor answer, shown directly below, which can only be edited by instructors. Multiple students are allowed contribute to each answer like Wikipedia entries, and each answer have a version history that shows what each student wrote. Users are allowed to attach external files to posts, use LaTeX formatting, view a post's edit history, add follow-up questions, and receive email notifications when new content is added. The interface consists of a dynamic list of posts on the left side of the screen, a central panel for viewing and contributing to individual posts, and an upper bar for account control. According to the company's data, the average Piazza question is answered within 14 minutes.

Individual Piazza classes are self-contained and can be locked with an access code. Anyone may create a class, but the head instructor retains full control over the class content, along with administrative abilities such as endorsing good answers and viewing more detailed statistics on class activity.

The Piazza team is based in Palo Alto, California.

In November 2011, Piazza launched iOS and Android mobile apps which allow students to share their ideas and get their queries answered.

See also
 Social constructivism

References

External links
 Official site
 Article in the New York Times
 Article in the Stanford Daily
 List of News Articles
 Featured post in Terri Griffith's Technology and Organizations blog

Palo Alto, California
Educational technology companies of the United States
Internet properties established in 2009
Software companies based in California
Question-and-answer websites
Software companies of the United States